Loxostegopsis xanthocrypta is a moth in the family Crambidae. It is found in Mexico, California, Florida, Nevada and Texas.

The wingspan is 17–18 mm. The forewings are dark grey with dark lines with whitish edges. The hindwings are fuscous with a dark line. Adults are on wing in March, from May to July and in September.

References

Spilomelinae
Moths described in 1913